Harmoney is an online direct personal lender that operates across Australia and New Zealand. The company was established in 2014 to introduce peer-to-peer lending to New Zealand. Harmoney provides risk-priced, unsecured personal loans up to $70,000 and has issued NZD $2 billion worth of loans as of March 2021.

Launched in September 2014, Harmoney was the first licensed provider in New Zealand after peer-to-peer lending and crowdfunding were enabled on 1 April 2014, following the passing of new financial legislation in New Zealand.

Harmoney originally started with peer-to-peer lending but ceased providing retail investors with new loans on 1 April 2020, instead focusing on funding loans to borrowers from a mixture of institutional financing, and lending from its own balance sheet. In Australia, Harmoney obtained its Australian Financial Services Licence from ASIC to operate peer-to peer-lending, but never accepted retail funds. Similarly to New Zealand, the Australian entity funds loans through a mix of institutional financing, and lending from its own balance sheet.

History
Harmoney was founded in late 2013 by Neil Roberts who became CEO of the new company. Roberts is the largest share owner of Harmoney. Heartland Bank announced it had taken a 10% stake in the platform and provided a funding line in September, 2014.

Harmoney launched on 10 September 2014, after it had obtained a licence by the Financial Markets Authority on 8 July 2014. At that time, the company said it had NZD $100 million available to lend from four main investors including Heartland Bank.

Since founding, Harmoney has had three capital raises, successfully bringing in more capital and strategic investors. Trade Me announced in January 2015 it had acquired a 15% stake for $7.7 million. Soon after, then-CFO Jonathan Klouwens joined Harmoney's board of directors. Icehouse (New Zealand based business incubator) holds a 2% stake.

In October 2019, Harmoney successfully completed a Series C funding round which raised AU$22.9 million (NZ$25 million) in capital from Australian private equity firm Kirwood Capital and a private institutional investor based in New Zealand. In addition, Harmoney implemented a AU$20 million (NZ$21.9 million) corporate debt facility with an Australian investment fund to bring the raising to AU$42.9 million (NZ$47 million). The corporate debt facility was to be used to expand Harmoney's customer base and debt warehousing programme.

In September 2020, Harmoney announced its full year financial results for the financial year ending June 2020. Revenue was $37 million, with a net loss of NZ$15.4 million, attributable in large part to the group’s transition to on-balance sheet loan funding, with immediate provision for expected future period credit losses, as well as a reduction in expected future revenue from peer-to-peer funded loans.

In November 2020, Harmoney successfully completed a dual listing on the Australian ASX and New Zealand NZX stock exchanges.

The current CEO of Harmoney is David Stevens, who was appointed in November 2019. Previous Joint CEOs, Neil Roberts and Brad Hagstrom remained with the company as Chief Product Officer and Chief Operating Officer respectively.

Business Model

Harmoney enables borrowers to apply for personal loans through its website. Loans are unsecured, and can be between $2,000 - $70,000 for three or five-year terms. Harmoney determines the creditworthiness of a borrower on the basis of their credit history, income, debt, and requested loan amount, among other things. Applicants are assigned an interest rate using in-house proprietary AI and machine learning models. Currently, as of July 2021, Harmoney offers rates ranging from 6.99% p.a. to 19.99% p.a. in New Zealand, and from 5.35% (comparison rates of 6.14% p.a.) in Australia.

Across New Zealand and Australia, residents aged 18 or older with a valid driver's licence or passport are eligible to apply for a loan through Harmoney. As at March 2021, Harmoney has loaned out more than $2 billion, through over 80,000 loans.  In July 2021, Harmoney reported 90+ day arrears of 0.69% of loan portfolio.

Harmoney makes money by charging an establishment fee to successful borrowers and a net interest margin (NIM) in its warehouses (NIM being the difference between the weighted average interest rate it lends to customers versus the weighted average cost of funds charged by wholesale funders). In Australia, the establishment fee is $275 for loans less than $5,000, and $575 for loans greater than $5,000. In New Zealand, this fee is $200 for loans less than $5,000 and $350 for loans greater than $5,000.

Board of directors
David Flacks (Chair), Independent Director. Former Partner - Bell Gully, former General Counsel and Company Secretary - Carter Holt Harvey.
Tracey Jones, Independent Director; COO & CFO, Tappenden Holdings Ltd.
Paul Lahiff, Independent Director.
David Stevens, CEO and Managing Director.
Neil Roberts, CPO and Founder.

See also
Peer-to-peer lending
Comparison of crowd funding services
Disintermediation

References

External links
Harmoney New Zealand Website
Harmoney Australia Website
Harmoney Blog
Harmoney on Twitter

Financial services companies of New Zealand
Financial services companies established in 2013
New Zealand companies established in 2013
Companies listed on the Australian Securities Exchange
Companies listed on the New Zealand Exchange